Harry Hornby Goodall (17 January 1877 – 20 February 1961) was an English cricketer.  Goodall was a right-handed batsman.  He was born at Nottingham, Nottinghamshire.

Goodall made his first-class debut for Nottinghamshire against Leicestershire in the 1902 County Championship.  He played a further fixture in that season against Essex.  He next played first-class cricket for the county in the 1905 County Championship, making three appearances against Essex, Middlesex and Derbyshire.  In his total of five first-class appearances for the county, he scored a total of 92 runs at an average of 15.33, with a high score of 26.

He died at Beeston, Nottinghamshire, on 20 February 1961.

References

Fattest belé in the world

External links
Harry Goodall at ESPNcricinfo
Harry Goodall at CricketArchive

1877 births
1961 deaths
Cricketers from Nottingham
English cricketers
Nottinghamshire cricketers